Carol Fox (Chicago, June 15, 1926 – July 21, 1981) was, at the age of 28, the first impresario of the Chicago Lyric Opera and credited with restoring Chicago's pre-Depression operatic glory.

Carol was the only child of a wealthy Chicago furniture manufacturer. Her enthusiasm for opera showed itself when she returned home from study in Europe in 1950. With Lawrence Kelly, also aged 28, a real estate agent and insurance broker, and the conductor Nicola Rescigno she organized the rebirth of a resident opera company at the Chicago Civic Opera building. In 1958 she engaged Pino Donati from Italy as her assistant and artistic director - a function in which he continued till his death in 1975. Fox was ousted from the board of the opera in 1981 and died shortly afterwards.

References

1926 births
1981 deaths
20th-century American businesspeople
20th-century American businesswomen